The Bangkok Patana School is a British International School located in Bang Na District, Bangkok, Thailand. Bangkok Patana School was founded in 1957 to provide a British-style education for the children of English-speaking expatriates and others living in Bangkok.

It is Thailand's oldest British international school. As of 2010, it is also the largest British school in the country.

Curriculum
Students range from 18 months to 18 years of age and follow the English National Curriculum until they sit IGCSE examinations at 16.  Senior students take the International Baccalaureate Diploma or Certificate in Years 12 and 13.

Student body
As of 2017, 24% of the students are from British families and this is the largest group of students by nationality. The school is international with the student body representing 60 - 65 nationalities.

Facilities
The 48 acre campus, situated in Bangna, includes purpose built classrooms, secondary and primary libraries, three swimming pools, an indoor sports centre, tennis courts and sports fields.  The school is also home to an Arts Centre, Science Centre, and a Theatre that offers facilities for students, teachers and the community.

Accreditation
Bangkok Patana School is accredited by the Council of International Schools (CIS), and is an IB World School.

Sports
The sports teams in the school compete under the name and mascot of tigers. Each sports teams use variations of the Tiger name, such as the tiger sharks for the swim team. The teams compete in tournaments such as BISAC, SEASAC and FOBISIA even at the Varsity level in sports like basketball, football, volleyball, softball, swimming, badminton and athletics. Bangkok Patana School opened their new sports hall in 2007 (to commemorate their 50th anniversary), which was opened by the Princess of Thailand. Bangkok Patana School along with other schools from around South-East Asia compete in the FOBISIA tournament every year. They have a range of, U9, U11, U13, U15, Junior Varsity and Varsity.

Environment
Bangkok Patana School is a silver certified green school. The School currently supplies some of its energy from solar. The School aims to enable well rounded Eco-Friendly Students.

Notable alumni
 Joni Anwar – singer and actor
 Ananda Everingham – actor
 Praekarn Nirandara (Pieretta Dawn) – author
 Alex Rendell – actor, singer
 Louis Scott - actor, singer, TV host, racer
 Urassaya Sperbund – actress, model
 Somtow Sucharitkul – Composer, conductor and author of "Vampire Junction"
 Erika Tham - actress
 Michele Waagaard – model, JAMP singer and VJ for MTV Thailand
 Tata Young – singer, actress and model

References

External links

 Bangkok Patana School official website

British international schools in Thailand
International Baccalaureate schools in Thailand
International schools in Bangkok
Educational institutions established in 1957
1957 establishments in Thailand
Private schools in Thailand